The 1912 North Dakota gubernatorial election was held on November 5, 1912. Republican nominee L. B. Hanna defeated Democratic nominee Frank O. Hellstrom with 45.45% of the vote.

Primary elections
Primary elections were held on June 26, 1912.

Democratic primary

Candidates
Frank O. Hellstrom, Warden of the North Dakota State Penitentiary
George P. Jones

Results

Republican primary

Candidates
L. B. Hanna, U.S. Representative
James A. Buchanan
C. A. Johnson
H. N. Midtbo

Results

General election

Candidates
Major party candidates
L. B. Hanna, Republican
Frank O. Hellstrom, Democratic

Other candidates
W. D. Sweet, Progressive
A. E. Bowen Jr., Socialist

Results

References

1912
North Dakota
Gubernatorial